The True Dakotan is a weekly newspaper in South Dakota.  The paper services the cities of Lane, Alpena, and Wessington Springs.  It publishes every Wednesday with a circulation of 1,338 and began publication in 1975.

In addition to news, the publication runs local human interest photos and stories that are picked up by other publications.

References

External links
 True Dakotan official website

Newspapers published in South Dakota